The Greensboro Transit Agency (GTA) is the operator of public transportation in the Greensboro, North Carolina area. It complements three other local and one regional bus service in the Piedmont Triad. Fifteen routes travel almost solely within the city limits.

In 1991, the Greensboro Transit Agency assumed operation of a private bus system run by Duke Energy (known at the time as Duke Power). The Greensboro Transit Agency consists of nine board members, each appointed for a two-year term by members of Greensboro City Council.

GTA collaborated with seven local colleges and universities in 2006 to create Higher Education Area Transit (HEAT), with nine routes serving the higher learning institutions and select destinations throughout the city.

GTA also operates Access GSO, a door-to-door and curb-to-curb paratransit service for passengers with disabilities that make riding fixed routes difficult. Previously known as Specialized Community Area Transportation (SCAT), the service was renamed in January of 2021 following community input.

In early 2011, GTA added a number of diesel-electric hybrid buses to their fleet.

There are currently 45 fixed-route buses in the GTA fleet, consisting of New Flyer, Gillig, and Chevrolet makes. There are 10 buses for HEAT, all Chevrolet makes. SCAT has almost 50 paratransit vans. GTA also has ten battery-electric rechargeable buses manufactured by Proterra, Inc.

History

Public Transportation Timeline

 1925 - Southern Public Utilities, a subsidiary of Duke Power, begins public transportation services in Greensboro
 1934 - Trackless trolleys begin service downtown
 1962 - First African-American driver, Ed Greenlee, takes the wheel
 1963 - Current bus fare is 15 cents per trip
 1964 - National civil rights laws end segregation on public buses
 1988 - Voters pass referendum authorizing property tax to support public transit
 1990 - City of Greensboro takes over transit services from Duke Power
 1991 - Greensboro City Council creates Greensboro Transit Authority; fare is 50 cents per trip
 1992 - GTA carries one millionth rider; launches Career Express
 1992 - GTA receives first lift-equipped buses and SCAT vans
 1993 - Bus fare is 70 cents per trip
 1995 - GTA displays first advertising painted bus
 1996 - African-American female appointed Public Transportation Manager
 1997 - Bus fare is $1 per trip
 1998 - Evening modified (deviated) bus service offered for first time since departure of Duke Transit
 1999 - Evening and Sunday fixed schedule offered 
 2000 - GTA debuts talking buses
 2002 - SCAT service area adjusted to 3/4 mile of Fixed Route Corridor except for previously established trips. 
 2003 - Opening of J. Douglas Galyon Depot multi-modal transportation center (Phase 1); six-month operational analysis performed on SCAT recommended elimination of monthly pass and grandfathered trips, establishment of premium fare for non-ADA trips and development of a method of payment for users who cannot easily manipulate a cash fare 
 2004 - GTA Board established a two-tiered fare structure that enabled riders who resided or traveled beyond the ADA service area to ride SCAT at a higher rate
 2005 City Council votes to terminate the two-tiered fare structure, institute a "single ADA paratransit service" and extend the SCAT service area to anywhere within the City limits at the same base fare for all trips
 2006 - Higher Education Area Transit (HEAT) begins service
 2007 - GTA Board adopts revised fare structure that supported City Council recommendation; adds sedans to fleet; GTA fare is $1.10 per trip; HEAT website wins American Public Transportation Association AdWheel Award; 30-minute service begins on all daytime routes
 2008 - GTA fare is $1.20 per trip
 2009 - Daytime routes extended from 7 to 15 routes; fare increased to $1.30 per trip as part of third planned fare increase
 2010 - GTA radio commercial wins American Public Transportation Association AdWheel Award; GTA Transportation Center offers free Wi-Fi and electronic charging station; HEAT adds direct routes to area shopping districts; construction begins on new Operations and Maintenance Facility and Administrative Offices
 2011 - GTA places into operation Greensboro's first diesel-electric hybrid buses
 2012 - GTA completes construction on new 66,000-square-foot Operations/Maintenance Facility and Administrative Office at 223 W. Meadowview Rd, fares increased to $1.50 per trip 
 2013 - GTA places in operation first gasoline-electric hybrid SCAT vans
 2014 - Debut of GoPass, GTA's first rechargeable smart card
 2015 - GTA wins marketing awards from North Carolina City-County Communicators
 2016 - Live bus tracking begins
 2017 - GTA wins American Public Transportation Association AdWheel Marketing Award
 2018 - North Carolina's first battery-electric buses to be placed into municipal service begins serving Greensboro. GTA wins American Public Transportation Association AdWheel Marketing Award
 2019 - Greensboro City Council changes Greensboro Transit Authority Board to Greensboro Transit Advisory Commission
 2019 - Operations and maintenance contracted to Keolis
 2022 - RATP Dev takes over as operations and maintenance contractor

Route list
This list does not include the HEAT routes which are also operated by the Greensboro Transit Agency with GTA fares.
1 West Wendover Avenue/Spring Garden Street
2 Four Seasons Boulevard
3 North Elm Street
4 Martin Luther King Jr Drive/Benbow Road/Willow Road
5 Gorrell Street
6 Summit Avenue/McKnight Mill Road
7 Friendly Avenue/Friendly Shopping Center
8 Battleground Avenue/Cotswold Avenue
9 West Market Street/Swing Road
10 East Market Street/Phillips Avenue
11 West Gate City Boulevard/GTCC Jamestown 
12 South Elm-Eugene Street
12A South Town Connector
13 Randleman Road
14 Bessemer Avenue/Phillips Avenue
15 Yanceyville Street/Brightwood School Road
17 Lawndale Drive

Sunday Routes
21 Summit Avenue/North Elm Street
22 East Market Street/Bessemer Avenue/Phillips Avenue
23 Gorrell Street/Benbow Street/MLK Jr
24 Randleman Road/South Elm-Eugene Street
25 Four Seasons Town Centre/West Gate City Boulevard 
26 West Wendover Avenue/West Friendly Avenue
27 Battleground Avenue/ Friendly Shopping Center

References

Bus transportation in North Carolina
Transportation in Greensboro, North Carolina
RATP Group